Minareliçavuş Spor Tesisleri, opened in 2014, is a sports facility for football matches in Bursa, Turkey.

Situated inside the Nilüfer Industrial Zone (NOSAB) at Minareliçavuş neighborhood of Nilüfer district in Bursa, the sports facility was built by Bursa Metropolitan Municipality and opened on January 4, 2014. It hosts matches of amateur clubs in addition to regular league matches. The stadium has a spectator capacity of 1,000. The construction cost almost 4 million.

The facility is home to Yeşil Bursa AŞ, formerly Oyak Renault G.S.D., which play in the TFF Third League.

Notable events

On September 17, 2014, Turkey women's national football team played their 2015 FIFA Women's World Cup qualification – UEFA Group 6 match against Belarus at this venue.

The stadium hosted three of the six 2015 UEFA Women's Under-19 Championship qualification Group 4 matches between September 13–18, 2014.

See also
List of football stadiums in Turkey

References

External links

Football venues in Turkey
Sport in Bursa
Sports venues completed in 2014
2014 establishments in Turkey